The 2012 Leeward Islands Junior Championships in Athletics took place on June 9–10, 2012.  The event was held at the A. O. Shirley Recreation Ground in Road Town, Tortola, British Virgin Islands.  Detailed reports were published.

A total of 45 events were contested, 22 by boys and 23 by girls.

Medal summary
Complete results can be found on the British Virgin Islands Athletics Association webpage.

Boys (U-20)

†: Open event for both U20 and U17 athletes.

Girls (U-20)

†: Open event for both U20 and U17 athletes.
‡: Result obtained during heptathlon.
J: Junior implements.
Y: Youth implements.

Boys (U-17)

Girls (U-17)

Medal table (unofficial)
This is the unofficial medal count without events marked as exhibition.

Participation
According to an unofficial count, 87 athletes from 7 countries participated.  The announced athletes from  did not show.

 (11)
 (18)
 (33)
/ (3)
 (2)
 (4)
 (16)

References

2012
Leeward Islands Junior Championships in Athletics
Leeward Islands Junior Championships in Athletics
2012 in youth sport